Bermuda Institute is a PreK-12 co-educational, Christian school located in Southampton, Bermuda. It is owned and operated by the Seventh-day Adventist Church.

It is a part of the Seventh-day Adventist education system, the world's second largest Christian school system.

History 
In September 1943, 17 pupils ranging from grades one to four began their education in one classroom in the basement of the building then known as the Bay View Apartments.

In 1953 the school was transferred to its campus and its 129 pupils relocated in a remodeled two-storey building, on the purchased Sandringham property. As the available classroom space proved inadequate, other classrooms had to be added which included the new modern elementary building which was opened in 1961.

Careful planning of the upgrading of the school's status to a Junior Academy was given by the Mission and at the Biennial Session of 1965, it was voted that a new wing be erected. The additional building has allowed for the program of the school to be expanded to include high school levels.

As a result, Bermuda Institute, by action of the Mission Biennial Session held May 1967, it has been a K-12 school. As of 2019 Bermuda Institute has opened up a Preschool. It is open and accepting new students from ages 3–4.

See also

 List of Seventh-day Adventist secondary and elementary schools
 Seventh-day Adventist education
 Seventh-day Adventist Church
 Seventh-day Adventist theology
 History of the Seventh-day Adventist Church

References 

Secondary schools affiliated with the Seventh-day Adventist Church
Schools in Bermuda
Secondary schools in Bermuda
Southampton Parish, Bermuda